USS George Washington (SSBN-598) was the United States's first operational ballistic missile submarine.  She was the lead ship of her class of nuclear ballistic missile submarines, was the third United States Navy ship of the name, in honor of Founding Father George Washington (1732–1799), the first president of the United States, and was the first of that name to be purpose-built as a warship.

Construction and launching 

George Washingtons keel was laid down at Electric Boat Division of General Dynamics, Groton, Connecticut on 1 November 1958. The first of her class, she was launched on 9 June 1959 sponsored by Mrs. Ollie Mae Anderson (née Rawlins), wife of US Treasury Secretary and former Secretary of the Navy Robert B. Anderson, and commissioned on 30 December 1959 as SSBN-598 with Commander James B. Osborn in command of the Blue crew and Commander John L. From, Jr. in command of the Gold crew.

George Washington was originally laid down as the attack submarine . During construction, she was lengthened by the insertion of a -long ballistic missile section and renamed George Washington; another submarine under construction at the time received the original name and hull number. Inside ''George Washingtons forward escape hatch, a plaque remained bearing her original name. Because the ballistic missile compartment design of George Washington was intended to be reused in later ship classes, the section inserted into George Washington was designed with a deeper test depth rating than the rest of the submarine.

Initial operationsGeorge Washington left Groton on 28 June 1960 for Cape Canaveral, Florida, where she loaded two Polaris missiles. Standing out into the Atlantic Missile Test Range with Rear Admiral William Raborn, head of the Polaris submarine development program, on board as an observer, she successfully conducted the first Polaris missile launch from a submerged submarine on 20 July 1960. At 12:39, George Washington's commanding officer sent President Dwight Eisenhower the message:
 
Less than two hours later a second missile from the submarine also struck the impact area  downrange.George Washington then embarked her Gold crew, and on 30 July 1960 she launched two more missiles while submerged. Shakedown for the Gold crew ended at Groton on 30 August and the boat got underway from that port on 28 October for Naval Weapons Station Charleston, to load her full complement of 16 Polaris missiles. There she was awarded the Navy Unit Commendation, after which her Blue crew took over and embarked on her first deterrent patrol.

The submarine completed her first patrol after 66 days of submerged running on 21 January 1961, and put in at Naval Submarine Base New London at New London, Connecticut. The Gold crew took over and departed on her next patrol on 14 February 1961. After the patrol, she entered Holy Loch, Scotland, on 25 April 1961.

In 1970 ten years after her initial departure from Groton, George Washington put in to refuel in Charleston SC, having cruised some .George Washington shifted to the United States Pacific Fleet and a new home port at Pearl Harbor, Hawaii after the refueling.

Collision with Nissho Maru

George Washington immediately surfaced and searched for the other vessel. Owing to the heavy fog conditions at the time, they did see the Nissho Maru heading off into the fog, but it appeared undamaged. It headed into port for repairs; the crew was later flown back to Pearl Harbor from Guam. Unbeknownst to the crew of the George Washington, Nissho Maru sank in about 15 minutes. Two Japanese crewmen were lost; 13 were rescued by Japan Maritime Self-Defense Force destroyers JDS Akigumo (DD-120) and Aogumo (ja). The submarine suffered minor damage to her sail.

The accident strained U.S.–Japanese relations a month before a meeting between Japanese Prime Minister Zenko Suzuki and President of the United States Ronald Reagan. Japan criticized the U.S. for taking more than 24 hours to notify Japanese authorities, and demanded to know what the boat was doing surfacing only about  outside Japan's territorial waters.

The U.S. Navy initially stated that George Washington executed a crash dive during the collision, and then immediately surfaced, but could not see the Japanese ship due to fog and rain (according to a  U.S. Navy report). A preliminary report released a few days later stated the submarine and aircraft crews both had detected Nissho Maru nearby, but neither the submarine nor the aircraft realized Nissho Maru was in distress.

On 11 April, President Reagan and other U.S. officials formally expressed regret over the accident, made offers of compensation, and reassured the Japanese there was no cause for worry about radioactive contamination. As is its standard policy, the U.S. Government refused to reveal what the submarine was doing close to Japan, or whether she was armed with nuclear missiles. (It is government and navy policy to neither confirm nor deny the presence of nuclear weapons on board.) The Navy accepted responsibility for the incident, and relieved and reprimanded the George Washingtons commanding officer and officer of the deck.

On 31 August, the U.S. Navy released its final report, concluding the accident resulted from a set of coincidences, compounded by errors on the part of two members of the submarine crew.

Final patrol as ballistic missile submarine
In 1981, George Washington returned to Pearl Harbor from her last missile patrol. In 1981, her missiles were unloaded at Bangor, Washington to comply with the SALT II treaty.George Washington made 55 deterrent patrols in both the Atlantic and Pacific oceans in her 25-year career.

Service as an attack submarineGeorge Washington  continued service as an attack submarine (SSN), returning briefly to Pearl Harbor. In 1983, she departed Pearl Harbor for the last time and made the second of four transits through the Panama Canal back to the Atlantic and to New London. While based at Submarine Base Groton, George Washington (SSN 598) participated in exercises including one teamed with a Coast Guard Cutter against the USS John F. Kennedy (CV-67) and Carrier Group 4. From Puerto Rico’s Roosevelt Roads Naval Station, she provided support for Special Forces training. She participated in the 24th UNITAS exercise as the only US submarine. At the conclusion of exercises with Chile, the George Washington completed circumnavigation of South America, escorting the USS Kennedy as she transited open water between Argentina and the Falkland Islands in the early months of 1984.

DecommissioningGeorge Washington was decommissioned on 24 January 1985, stricken from the Naval Vessel Registry on 30 April 1986, and scheduled for disposal through the Ship-Submarine Recycling Program at Puget Sound Naval Shipyard. Recycling of the ship was completed on 30 September 1998.

CommemorationGeorge Washington'''s sail was removed prior to disposal and now rests at the Submarine Force Library and Museum at Groton, Connecticut.

References

External links

 

Ships built in Groton, Connecticut
George Washington-class submarines
Cold War submarines of the United States
Nuclear submarines of the United States Navy
United States submarine accidents
Maritime incidents in 1981
Japan–United States relations
International maritime incidents
1959 ships
Articles containing video clips
Ships named for Founding Fathers of the United States